Lilian Kummer (born 8 July 1975 in Riederalp, Valais, Switzerland) is a retired Swiss alpine skier who competed in the 2002 Winter Olympics.

References

External links
 

1975 births
Living people
Olympic alpine skiers of Switzerland
Alpine skiers at the 2002 Winter Olympics
Sportspeople from Valais
Swiss female alpine skiers